The 2020 Washington Mystics season was the franchise's 23rd season in the Women's National Basketball Association (WNBA). The regular season tipped off versus the Indiana Fever on July 25, 2020.

This WNBA season will feature an all-time high 36 regular-season games. However, the plan for expanded games was put on hold on April 3, when the WNBA postponed its season due to the COVID-19 pandemic. Under a plan approved on June 15, the league is scheduled to hold a shortened 22-game regular season at IMG Academy, without fans present, starting on July 24.

The Mystics were without star Elena Delle Donne for the season, as she sat out due to COVID-19 concerns.  Expectations were lowered when it was announced that the 2019 MVP would be out for the season.  However, the Mystics defied those expectations in their first three games, winning all three.  However, the season took a drastic turn for the worse after that, with the team going 1–11 in their August games.  At 4–11 overall, the Mystics were on the outside looking in for the playoffs.  The Mystics went 5–2 in September, including a four game win-streak to finish the season and secure the eight seed in the playoffs.  As the eight seed, they lost in the first round to the Phoenix Mercury.

Transactions

WNBA Draft

Trades and roster changes

Roster

Game log

Regular season

|- style="background:#bbffbb;"
| 1
| July 25
| Indiana Fever
| W 101–76
| Hines-Allen (27)
| Hines-Allen (10)
| Mitchell (4)
| IMG AcademyNo In-Person Attendance
| 1–0
|- style="background:#bbffbb;"
| 2
| July 28
| Connecticut Sun
| W 94–89
| Powers (27)
| Hines-Allen (8)
| Meesseman (8)
| IMG AcademyNo In-Person Attendance
| 2–0
|- style="background:#bbffbb;"
| 3
| July 30
| Seattle Storm
| W 89–71
| Atkins (22)
| Powers (8)
| Mitchell (6)
| IMG AcademyNo In-Person Attendance
| 3–0

|- style="background:#fcc;"
| 4
| August 1
| Chicago Sky
| L 86–88
| Atkins (24)
| Hines-Allen (10)
| Meesseman (6)
| IMG AcademyNo In-Person Attendance
| 3–1
|- style="background:#fcc;"
| 5
| August 5
| Las Vegas Aces
| L 77–83
| Meesseman (24)
| Meesseman (13)
| Mitchell (4)
| IMG AcademyNo In-Person Attendance
| 3–2
|- style="background:#fcc;"
| 6
| August 7
| New York Liberty
| L 66–74
| Powers (20)
| Hines-Allen (8)
| Mitchell (5)
| IMG AcademyNo In-Person Attendance
| 3–3
|- style="background:#fcc;"
| 7
| August 9
| Indiana Fever
| L 84–91
| Meesseman (19)
| Hawkins (10)
| Mitchell (5)
| IMG AcademyNo In-Person Attendance
| 3–4
|- style="background:#fcc;"
| 8
| August 11
| Minnesota Lynx
| L 48–68
| Hines-Allen (12)
| 3 tied (6)
| 3 tied (3)
| IMG AcademyNo In-Person Attendance
| 3–5
|- style="background:#fcc;"
| 9
| August 13
| Los Angeles Sparks
| L 64–81
| Atkins (20)
| Meesseman (11)
| Tied (5)
| IMG AcademyNo In-Person Attendance
| 3–6
|- style="background:#fcc;"
| 10
| August 15
| Las Vegas Aces
| L 73–88
| Atkins (17)
| Meesseman (9)
| Tied (5)
| IMG AcademyNo In-Person Attendance
| 3–7
|- style="background:#bbffbb;"
| 11
| August 19
| Atlanta Dream
| W 98–91
| Johnson (25)
| Meesseman (6)
| Meesseman (10)
| IMG AcademyNo In-Person Attendance
| 4–7
|- style="background:#fcc;"
| 12
| August 21
| Dallas Wings
| L 92–101 (OT)
| Hines-Allen (35)
| Hines-Allen (12)
| Mitchell (4)
| IMG AcademyNo In-Person Attendance
| 4–8
|- style="background:#fcc;"
| 13
| August 23
| Phoenix Mercury
| L 87–88
| Hawkins (19)
| Hines-Allen (13)
| Hines-Allen (8)
| IMG AcademyNo In-Person Attendance
| 4–9
|- style="background:#fcc;"
| 14
| August 28
| Phoenix Mercury
| L 72–94
| Mitchell (17)
| Tied (6)
| Mitchell (5)
| IMG AcademyNo In-Person Attendance
| 4–10
|- style="background:#fcc;"
| 15
| August 30
| Connecticut Sun
| L 63–76
| Tied (14)
| Hines-Allen (13)
| Hines-Allen (6)
| IMG AcademyNo In-Person Attendance
| 4–11

|- style="background:#fcc;"
| 16
| September 2
| Seattle Storm
| L 64–71
| Meesseman (17)
| Hines-Allen (6)
| Mitchell (5)
| IMG AcademyNo In-Person Attendance
| 4–12
|- style="background:#bbffbb;"
| 17
| September 4
| Chicago Sky
| W 79–69
| Mitchell (20)
| Hines-Allen (10)
| Mitchell (12)
| IMG AcademyNo In-Person Attendance
| 5–12
|- style="background:#fcc;"
| 18
| September 6
| Dallas Wings
| L 94–101 (OT)
| Atkins (22)
| Hines-Allen (13)
| Mitchell (9)
| IMG AcademyNo In-Person Attendance
| 5–13
|- style="background:#bbffbb;"
| 19
| September 8
| Minnesota Lynx
| W 89–86
| Hines-Allen (26)
| Hines-Allen (9)
| Mitchell (10)
| IMG AcademyNo In-Person Attendance
| 6–13
|- style="background:#bbffbb;"
| 20
| September 10
| Los Angeles Sparks
| W 80–72
| Hines-Allen (30)
| Hines-Allen (8)
| Mitchell (9)
| IMG AcademyNo In-Person Attendance
| 7–13
|- style="background:#bbffbb;"
| 21
| September 12
| New York Liberty
| W 75–58
| Hines-Allen (25)
| Hines-Allen (11)
| Meesseman (7)
| IMG AcademyNo In-Person Attendance
| 8–13
|- style="background:#bbffbb;"
| 22
| September 13
| Atlanta Dream
| W 85–78
| Atkins (26)
| Hines-Allen (10)
| Tied (7)
| IMG AcademyNo In-Person Attendance
| 9–13

Playoffs 

|- style="background:#fcc;"
| 1
| September 15
| Phoenix Mercury
| L 84–85
| Mitchell (25)
| Hines-Allen (9)
| 4 tied (4)
| IMG Academy
| 0–1

Standings

Playoffs

Statistics

Regular season

Awards and honors

References

External links 
 Official website of the Washington Mystics

Washington Mystics
Washington Mystics seasons